Mecodema  howitti (syn. Mecodema rectolineatum, Mecodema walkeri), termed the Large Banks Peninsula ground beetle, is a carnivorous forest ground beetle in the genus Mecodema. It is endemic to Banks Peninsula, Canterbury, New Zealand, and is the largest of the 16 carabids found in the area.

There are very limited records, and in general there is little ecological knowledge about this species. M. howitti is listed as threatened, range-restricted, and sparse within Banks Peninsula, however the Department of Conservation has been prevented from ranking this species as a priority threatened species due to the lack of ecological information available.

Description
Mecodema howitti is the largest of the 16 carabid species that can be found in Banks Peninsula, measuring 26-33mm (0.87-1.30"). M. howitti are flightless and nocturnal.

The body of M. howitti is matte black. The head of M. howitti consists of 1-6 setae arising from a single socket above the eye, or 3 separate setae slightly behind the eye. The thorax is cordate in shape and often has hind corners. There are 10-20 setae on the thorax margins, but are seldom found on the hind corners. The elytra are ovoid in shape, lacking distinct shoulders. The elytra are sometimes coloured brown-black.

Range
Mecodema howitti is one of about 430 known ground beetle species in New Zealand, and is one of 63 Mecodema species that are endemic to New Zealand. M. howitti is endemic to central and eastern parts of Banks Peninsula, Canterbury, New Zealand. They can be found at both lowland and higher altitudes. Historically, in the 1950s, they have been found in western and northern Banks Peninsula, although habitat loss and high densities of predators have most likely contributed to their absence in these areas. Their sparsity throughout Banks Peninsula is most likely due to their poor mobility. Similarly, the decline in their numbers since the 1900s is most likely due to habitat loss by logging and farming, forest fires, and the increase in predator species in the area, such as hedgehogs and rats. The level of disturbance to their local habitat by stock animals and predators may also influence distribution of M. howitti as well as that of their prey.

It is believed that the survival of M. howitti may become threatened in the next 50 years, because they have disappeared from the Port Hills district since 1940, and have not been found in western parts of Banks Peninsula since 1980.

Habitat
Mecodema howitti are flightless and nocturnal, preferring shaded, vegetated sites. They shelter under fallen logs or large branches during the day time. Like most other carabid species, M. howitti prefer cool, damp local habitats. They have been known to shelter under rocks, however abundance is not as strong here as under woody surface debris. Log remains have been identified as an important aspect of their habitat, however, they may not be a habitat requirement as they could provide for more favourable microhabitat conditions, such as higher moisture levels and lower temperature levels, but also increased prey availability. Adult M. howitti do not purely rely on woody local habitats, however, as they are known to burrow into the soil.

Ecology
Phenology

Behavioral patterns and activities of M. howitti are very temperature-dependent. M. howitti show their highest level of activity is during spring and summer months. This is because their activity is dependent on climate conditions such as soil temperature, moisture and rainfall. M. howitti is a nocturnal species but can be present during the day if conditions are moist and light is low. Daytime activity is usually in breeding periods in spring and summer as the beetles have been seen copulating during the day in these periods. The main reason why the species is nocturnal is because they are very susceptible to predation during daylight hours. M. howitti are very inactive during winter so it is believed they may hibernate during this period.

Mecodema howitti is still under-documented, so little is known about their eggs, larvae, subsequent developmental stages, or longevity.

Mecodema howitti do not migrate, and so gene flow is restricted.. Road and farmland development in the area has resulted in these small populations becoming isolated, and extinction is possible if there are major environmental change.

Diet, prey and foraging

Mecodema howitti are carnivorous predatory opportunists, feeding on smaller organisms when they are available. Although M. howitti are not specialised hunters of any particular species, they have been known to feed off larvae, pupae and adult invertebrates, such as Tenebrio molitor larvae, pupae of Tipulidae, and adult Holcaspis suteri. M. howitti tend to burrow through upper layers of soil to find their prey.

Predators, parasites and diseases

Native predators include morepork and Buff weka (Gallirallus australis hectori), although Buff weka are now absent from Banks Peninsula. Most introduced carnivorous predators in the area are nocturnal hunters of invertebrates, such as the possum, ferrets, weasels, rats, and hedgehogs. Mites from the Micromegistus genus have been associated with M. howitti. It is thought that only large carabid species are hosts to these mites, as researchers have not found them on smaller carabid species. It is likely that M. howitti are parasitised by Micromegistus species because of the larger and more preferable microhabitats that M. howitti offer; Micromegistus may also feed on food remains leftover by M. howitti.

Other information
Although endemic New Zealand species tend to have cultural uses or significance to Māori it is not known if M. howitti are considered important to iwi in the area.

External links
iNaturalist observation of M. howitti by Jacob Littlejohn

References

howitti
Beetles of New Zealand
Beetles described in 1867